William Huskinson Denstone (Staffordshire, 1867 - Montevideo, 8 September 1925) was a British newspaper editor.

For a brief period he was editor of the Montevideo Independent (1887-1888); then he founded (1889) and edited The Montevideo Times.

His remains are buried at The British Cemetery Montevideo, plot A 161.

References

1867 births
1925 deaths
People from Staffordshire
British expatriates in Uruguay
British newspaper editors
Burials at The British Cemetery Montevideo